The Lebanon men's national handball team represents Lebanon in international handball.

Asian Championship record
 2008 – 9th
 2010 – 8th
 2016 – 10th

External links
IHF profile

Men's national handball teams
Handball in Lebanon
Handball